Sleigher is a surname. Notable people with the name include:

Louis Sleigher (born 1958), Canadian ice hockey player
Pierre-Luc Sleigher (born 1982), Canadian ice hockey player

See also
Slayer (disambiguation)
Sleigh (disambiguation)